Betanzos is a Spanish geographical indication for Vino de la Tierra wines located in the autonomous region of Galicia. Vino de la Tierra is one step below the mainstream Denominación de Origen indication on the Spanish wine quality ladder.

The area covered by this geographical indication comprises the municipalities of Coirós, Bergondo, Betanzos and Paderne, in the province of A Coruña, in Galicia, Spain.

There are four principal warehouses: Adegas Lorenzo Bescansa, Bodegas Rilo, Adegas Codeseira, Casa Beade  and Viña Ártabra 

It acquired its Vino de la Tierra status in 2001.

Grape varieties
 Red: Mencía, Caiño and Gran negro
 White: Palomino, Godello and Blanco Lexítimo

References

Spanish wine
Wine regions of Spain
Wine-related lists
Appellations
Galicia (Spain)